Wheelchair curling is a team sport that is contested at the Winter Paralympic Games. 

Wheelchair curling was first included in the official programme of the 2006 Games in Turin, Italy.

In total, 30 athletes have won a medal in curling, and 3 have won two. Sonja Gaudet of Canada (two gold), Jalle Jungnell and Anette Wilhelm of Sweden (two bronze) have won two medals. 

Teams from Canada have been successful in the sport, winning the gold medal at each Paralympics. A total of 6 medals (two of each color) have been awarded since 2006 and have been won by teams from four National Paralympic Committees (NPC).



Mixed team

* suspended

Multiple medalists

See also

List of Olympic medalists in curling

References
General

 

Wheelchair curling
Medalists
Wheelchair curling
Wheelchair curling